Fox on the Run may refer to:

"Fox on the Run" (Sweet song), 1974
"Fox on the Run" (Manfred Mann song), 1968